Baro or Baró may refer to:

Places
Bangladesh
 Baro Vatra, a village in Gopalganj District

Guinea
 Baro, Guinea

Iran
 Baro, Iran, a village in Zanjan Province

Nigeria
 Baro (Nigeria), a town in Niger state
 Baro-Kano Railway Station

Spain
 Torre Baró, a neighbourhood in Barcelona
 Baró de Viver, a neighbourhood in Barcelona

People
 Baro (singer) (born 1992), South Korean idol and member of B1A4
 Baro Urbigerus, seventeenth-century German writer on alchemy
 Alan Baró (born 1985), Spanish footballer
 Amparo Baró (born 1937), Spanish actress
 Balthazar Baro (1596–1650), French poet, playwright and romance-writer
 Bernardo Baró (1896–1930), Cuban baseball player
 Eguinaire Baron or Baro (1495–1550), French jurist
 Gregorio Baro (1928–2012), Argentinian scientist
 Peter Baro (1534–1599), French huguenot minister
 Ignacio Martín-Baró (1942–1989), Spanish social psychologist

Clothing
Baro means "clothing" in the Tagalog language, and can refer to:
 Baro't saya, the Philippine national dress for women
 Barong Tagalog, the Philippine national dress for men
 Maria Clara gown (also called terno), a formal version of the baro't saya

Other uses 
 Baro (album), by Habib Koité & Bamada
 Baro (Black Clover), a character in the manga series Black Clover